Corey Patrick Whisenhunt (born on May 18, 1988, in Kettering, Ohio) is an American soccer player who plays as a goalkeeper for the Cincinnati Swerve in Major League Indoor Soccer.

Whisenhunt began playing for the Cincinnati Swerve during the 2017–18 Major Arena Soccer League 2 season. He was named to the All-League Second Team that same season.

External links
 Wright State profile
 M2 profile
 MLIS profile

1988 births
Living people
American soccer players
American expatriate soccer players
High Point Panthers men's soccer players
Wright State Raiders men's soccer players
Cincinnati Kings players
Dayton Dutch Lions players
Antigua Barracuda F.C. players
Expatriate footballers in Antigua and Barbuda
USL League Two players
USL Championship players
American expatriate sportspeople in Antigua and Barbuda
Association football goalkeepers
Soccer players from Ohio
Indoor soccer goalkeepers